John Galloway King Martin (born 27 October 1958) is a Scottish former footballer who played as a goalkeeper for Airdrieonians for nineteen years and later spent one season with Cowdenbeath, achieving promotion in the 2000–01 season.

Martin played in both the 1992 and 1995 Scottish Cup Finals for Airdrieonians and was the Kilnockie goalkeeper in the 2002 film A Shot at Glory. Martin often swung on the crossbar during games at the behest of supporters.

Opposition fans would often taunt him with chants of "scab" due to his reported strike breaking exploits during the miner's strike of 1983–84.

Honours
Airdrieonians
Scottish Challenge Cup: 1994–95

See also
 List of footballers in Scotland by number of league appearances (500+)

References

External links
 
 

1958 births
Living people
Footballers from Edinburgh
Association football goalkeepers
Scottish footballers
Airdrieonians F.C. (1878) players
Cowdenbeath F.C. players
Bathgate Thistle F.C. players
Scottish Football League players
Preston Athletic F.C. players
People from Prestonpans